Telekom Baskets Bonn, also known as Baskets Bonn, is a German professional basketball club that is based in Bonn, Germany.  The club plays in the Basketball Bundesliga, which is the highest level pro basketball league in Germany. The club's sponsor is the German company, Deutsche Telekom, a major telephone and internet company, which also sells mobile phones (T-Mobile) in the United States. The club's home arena is the Telekom Dome.

The Baskets reached the German League Final Four nine times in 17 years of league affiliation, and belong to Germany's most successful teams. Bonn reached the league finals five times, in 1997, 1999, 2001, 2008, and 2009, albeit coming up short on each occasion.

History

The beginning
The Telekom Baskets Bonn was founded in 1992 when the German clubs Godesberger Turnverein 1888 eV (Godesberg Gymnastics Club) and SC Fortuna Bonn merged. The basketball team of the Godesberger TV had been founded in 1970, whereas the SC Fortuna Bonn had been founded in 1973. The Godesberger TV was promoted to the Basketball Bundesliga in 1990. A year later, the club was relegated, and the associated economic problems eventually lead to the 1992 merger of the departments of the two basketball teams to BG Bonn 92. The following year, the club switched names to Post SV Bonn. In 1995, the club switched names again to Telekom Baskets Bonn, sponsored by the German telecommunications company Deutsche Telekom.

Entry of the Deutsche Telekom and early years in the Bundesliga 

In April 1995, the Telekom Baskets Bonn declared their goal to be promoted to the Bundesliga in 1997. But already in the 1995–96 season the team finished the second division unbeaten and moved up to Germany's prime basketball league. There, the Baskets managed to establish themselves immediately, supported by an ecstatic home crowd at the newly built Hardtberghalle of the Hardtberg School Center. In their first season the Baskets succeeded to the finals of the German Championship. There, they lost 1:3 against Alba Berlin. In the following years they always reached the playoffs until the 2004–05 season. In 2005, the Baskets finished the regular season at the No. 9 position. Then coach Predrag Krunić was relieved of his duties. In December 2005, Michael Koch the former national team captain became the team's new head coach. Previously, for a few months Bonn was coached by the Croat Danijel Jusup.

From 1998 to 2002, the Baskets had a cooperation agreement with the SG Sechtem. This cooperation ended in 2002 due to a new strategic orientation of both clubs.

Moving to the Telekom Dome and the era Mike Koch

In 2008, the Baskets moved from its previous venue, the Hardtberghalle, to the newly built Telekom Dome. Thus, the Telekom Baskets became Germany's first basketball club to build its own arena with adjoining training center.

The Baskets then intensified the training of their own youth players and in the 2006–07 season started a cooperation with former rival Dragons Rhöndorf. Under the name SG Bonn / Rhöndorf the club sent various youth teams to Germany's prime youth divisions. The club's aim was to increase the number of their own players to jump into the squad of the 1st team. The club's first success stories are both Fabian Thülig and Jonas Wohlfarth-Bottermann. Under coach Mike Koch the Baskets succeeded to the finals of the National Basketball League both in 2007–08, as well as in 2008–09. There, the Baskets finished runner-up to Alba Berlin and the EWE Baskets Oldenburg. The season 2010–11, however, was the weakest since the rise of the Telekom Baskets to Germany's first division. With only 14 wins and 20 defeats, the Baskets finished the season ranked 13th and missed the play-offs for only the second time in their club history.

For the 2011–12 season Mike Koch remained head coach of the Telekom Baskets and built a new squad. New additions such as Benas Veikalas, Tony Gaffney, Talor Battle, Daniel Hain and Andrej Mangold and most notably former player Jared Jordan joined the team. Together they led the team through a regular season full of ups and downs. At the end they finished at the 8th spot with 18 wins and 16 defeats. In the quarter-finals of the playoffs, the Baskets were subject to a 1:3 result as they were beaten in 4 matches by defending champions Brose Baskets Bamberg. The Baskets Bonn also reached the Cup final where they were also beaten by Bamberg at Bonn's own court.

2012–13, the Baskets qualified for the play-offs again. Overall, the team finished the season ranked 7th in the regular season. A few months into the season the team was supplemented by forward Jamel McLean, who replaced Patrick Ewing Jr. In the quarterfinals, the Baskets met the EWE Baskets Oldenburg. There, the Baskets Bonn were eliminated with 2:3 victories after 5 games. After the season, the contract of coach Michael Koch was not extended, thus the Koch era ended after eight years as head coach of the team. When he left the club, he had been the longest serving head coach of the league.

Two new faces for the club's main tasks
In May 2013, as the successor to Michael Koch, the Telekom Baskets Bonn presented Mathias Fischer as the new head coach. Fischer had worked for the LTi Giessen 46ers before and had been responsible for several youth programs and national selections of Germany. Under his leadership, especially the youth development should expand and receive new impetus to the cooperation with the Dragons Rhöndorf. In addition to Fischer, the Baskets presented Michael Wichterich as new full-time sports manager. Wichterich is a former player of the Baskets and the Dragons Rhöndorf. He had previously worked for the Dragons where he was in a similar position as Arvid Kramer in 2004. Wichterich is only the second full-time manager of the club. The previous manager Andreas Boettcher is still involved in management.

After two seasons at the helm that included solid regular season results and first round exits in the playoffs, Bonn got off to a 6–1 start in 2015–16 before breaking down in a major way. The Baskets finished with a 12–22 record that included a string of 14 consecutive losses in BBL and FIBA EuroCup, culminating in Fischer's dismissal. He was replaced by interim coach Carsten Pohl and later succeeded by Silvano Poropat. Following the conclusion of the regular season, the management also decided to part ways with point guard Andrej Mangold who had been with Bonn for five years. 

After Poropat left the team in September 2016 due to an undisclosed illness, former coach Predrag Krunić returned to Bonn for a second coaching stint. Major additions for the 2016–17 season included former Bamberg player Ryan Thompson, point guard Josh Mayo, and center Julian Gamble.
In the 2016/2017 season, the Baskets bounced back by reaching a playoff-spot and finished the regular season on the seventh place with a 18–14 record. In the playoffs, Bonn managed to win the first game of the quarterfinals against the defending champs Brose Bamberg, but ended up losing the series 1:3.

The following 2017/2018 season, Bonn nearly could gain home court advantage in the first round of the playoffs, but just came up short in this race despite finishing on a good fifth place with a 21–13 record. In the quarterfinals, the Baskets played against Brose Bamberg again but could not get a win this time by losing the quarterfinal series 0:3.

After winning the first three games in the 2018/2019 season, the Baskets lost eight out of the next ten regular season games. In January 2019 former assistant coach Chris O’Shea became head coach right before the German cup semifinals, which Bonn lost 87:90 against Brose Bamberg who ended up winning the cup. Bonn won eight out of the next eleven games and finished the regular season with an impressive 102:98 home win against Bayern Munich, who won the German league title in the last two years. In the playoffs, Bonn had to play EWE Baskets Oldenburg and lost the series 0:3.

In February 2020, after 17 match days, the club announced the hiring of Will Voigt as head coach of the team , who previously coached Angola's national team. He is the successor of Thomas Päch, who was assigned as head coach in summer 2019. The results of the regular Basketball Bundesliga season (BBL) did not meet overall's expectations, whereas in the Basketball Champions League, Telekom Baskets Bonn have reached the round of the last 16 remaining teams and compete against AEK Athens in the first round of the Play-offs. Voigt ended his first Bonn stint at the conclusion of the 2019-20 season, but was hired again in January 2021, when Bonn fired Igor Jovović. Voigt parted ways with Bonn after the 2020-21 season, Tuomas Iisalo was appointed the new head coach in May 2021.

The Iisalo legacy (2021-present)
The Iisalo brothers Tuomas (head coach) and Joonas (assistant) took Bonn from a medium power to second place and qualified for the Bundesliga playoff semifinals. The Iisalos' tactics were known for a lot of passing.
In 2022, Joonas left Bonn to become head coach at MLP Academics Heidelberg. 
Tuomas meanwhile has continued as Bonn's head coach.

Arenas
1995–1996: Sportpark Pennenfeld (capacity: 700)
1996–2008: Hardtberghalle (capacity: 3,500)
Since 2008: Telekom Dome (capacity: 6,000)

Players

Current roster

Depth chart

Head coaches

Notable players
To appear in this section a player must have played at least two seasons for the club AND either:
– Set a club record or won an individual award as a professional player.
– Played at least one official international match for his senior national team at any time.

Season by season

Youth development
Through building the Telekom Dome, the Baskets have further professionalized and intensified their youth work and, together with the cooperation partner Dragons Rhöndorf, offer a consistent system for young players for personal and sporting development. This includes a wide range of teams which practice and compete in the Telekom Dome. Several players, such as Fabian Thülig, Jonas Wohlfarth-Bottermann and Florian Koch are examples of players from the Baskets youth who became starters in at least several Basketball Bundesliga games. Previously, all three played for the Dragons Rhöndorf in the Pro A, and Pro B.

Manufacturer
2015: Spalding

See also
Bonn–Bamberg basketball brawl

References

External links
 
Eurobasket.com Team Profile
Eurocup Team Profile
Facebook presentation

 
Basketball teams established in 1992
Basketball clubs in North Rhine-Westphalia
Sport in Bonn
1992 establishments in Germany